The year 1645 in science and technology involved some significant events.

Astronomy
 The Solar cycle enters the 70-year Maunder Minimum.
 First published map of the Moon produced by Michael van Langren.
 A version of the law of gravitation is suggested by Ismaël Bullialdus in his .

Medicine
 October 18 – English physician Daniel Whistler presents the first printed pediatric text on rickets, as his MD thesis at Leiden University.

Technology
 A magic lantern is invented by Althanasius Kircher; like a slide projector, it could project enlarged drawings onto a wall.

Publications
 Publication of Robert Dudley's Dell'Arcano del Mare begins in Italian at Florence. A comprehensive work on navigation, shipbuilding and astronomy, it includes an original maritime atlas of the entire world, which is the first such in print, the first made by an Englishman, and the first to use the Mercator projection.

Births
 September 21 – Louis Jolliet, French Canadian explorer (died 1700)
 November 17 – Nicolas Lemery, French chemist (died 1715)

Deaths
 approx. date – Jean de Chastelet, French mining engineer (born c. 1578)

References

 
17th century in science
1640s in science